"The Incredible World of Horace Ford" is an episode in season four of the American television anthology series The Twilight Zone. In this episode, a toy designer fixated on his childhood days finds that he travels back to those times whenever he revisits his old neighborhood.

Opening narration

Plot
Horace Ford is a 38-year-old toy designer whose life is dominated by blissfully happy memories of his childhood. His colleagues, wife, and mother have all become increasingly frustrated with his obsession.

One day, he decides to revisit his childhood neighborhood. Ford discovers, to his amazement, that it has not changed. He recognizes the boys he played with in his childhood—who have not aged. Frightened, he returns to his apartment, but he visits his old neighborhood again on each of the next several nights. Each night the same scene plays out and he stays slightly longer, before returning to his apartment.

On his last visit, he hears his old friends complaining that he did not invite them to his birthday party. He tries to talk to them, and suddenly turns into a boy again. His friends bully and assault him, as Horace realizes that his childhood was not as pleasant as he would nostalgically recall. After his wife finds him, he "grows up"—returning to his own time period and age group with a new-found appreciation for life as an adult.

Closing narration

Themes
This episode revisits themes used in the series in the episodes "The Trouble with Templeton" (season 2) and "Walking Distance" (season 1)—namely, a person's propensity to romanticize and try to relive a past that may not have been at all as good as they like to remember it.

Production notes
Reginald Rose originally wrote "The Incredible World of Horace Ford" as a teleplay for Westinghouse Studio One, which originally aired live on June 13, 1955, starring Art Carney in the title role, with Leora Dana as Laura. The original ending was somewhat downbeat, and producer Herbert Hirschman asked Rose to create a slightly different (and happier) ending. Accordingly, the Twilight Zone version of the script is largely identical to the Studio One version, except that an epilogue has been added. In the Studio One version, the story ends at the Fords' apartment, with the audience invited to assume that Horace has been permanently transported back to his miserable past. In the Twilight Zone version, the story continues on: Laura leaves the apartment to find Horace, who magically transforms back into an adult and vows not to live in the past any longer.

Cast
Pat Hingle as Horace Maxwell Ford
Nan Martin as Laura Ford
Ruth White as Mrs. Ford
Phillip Pine as Leonard O'Brien
Vaughn Taylor as Mr. Judson
Jerry Davis as Hermie Brandt
Billy Hughes as Kid
Mary Carver as Betty O'Brien 
Jim E. Titus as Horace as a boy

References
DeVoe, Bill. (2008). Trivia from The Twilight Zone. Albany, GA: Bear Manor Media. 
Grams, Martin. (2008). The Twilight Zone: Unlocking the Door to a Television Classic. Churchville, MD: OTR Publishing.

External links

1963 American television episodes
The Twilight Zone (1959 TV series season 4) episodes
Television shows written by Reginald Rose
Fiction set in 1935
Fiction set in 1963
Television episodes about time travel
Television episodes directed by Abner Biberman